The iRobot R-Gator is an unmanned robotic platform from  iRobot Corporation and John Deere. The  robot is built upon Deere's M-Gator currently in use by the US Military. The R-Gator can operate autonomously, performing perimeter patrol and other missions while keeping personnel out of harm's way. It can operate autonomously by following a map or choosing its own waypoints to reach a pre-determined destination. It can also do "follow the leader" operations to keep up with troops, be tele-operated, or driven manually if needed. In military exercises, the R-Gator has shown an ability to carry gear for soldiers to lighten their loads. An R-Gator could deploy the smaller machine and provide unmanned perimeter security while the EOD robot dismantles the bomb. The first R-Gator sale to the military was to the U.S. Navy Space and Naval Warfare Systems Command for autonomous perimeter security.

References

External links
 John Deere: R-Gator
 Gizmag article
 Defense Update article

Unmanned ground vehicles
IRobot
John Deere vehicles